Muhamad Norfiqrie bin Abdul Talib (born 31 January 1996) is Malaysian professional footballer who plays as a left-back and right-back for Malaysia Super League club PDRM.

Club career

Kedah
Norfiqrie has been promoted to the first team in 2018.

Career statistics

Club

Honours

Club
Kedah Darul Aman
 Malaysia FA Cup: 2019

References

External links
 

1996 births
Living people
People from Kedah
Malaysian footballers
Association football defenders
Kedah Darul Aman F.C. players
Malaysia Super League players